Moon Fate is the sixteenth book in the series of Deathlands. It was written by Laurence James under the house name James Axler.

Plot synopsis
Ryan Cawdor arrives in the remains of the New Mexico MAT-TRANS chamber with his son Dean, having rescued him from a slave camp to the north. Once they exit the facility the pair see smoke coming from the direction of Jak Lauren's ranch, where their friends Krysty Wroth, J.B. Dix, Dr. Theophilus Tanner, and Mildred Wyeth were waiting for Ryan's return. Ryan and Dean set off for the ranch, fearing the worst. When they arrive they discover the ranch burned to the ground and completely deserted, but curiously find no bodies, not even the remains of the absent livestock. Further adding to the confusion there are only a small number of bullet casings found on the property, and inside the still-standing smokehouse Ryan discovers several pieces of smoked meat infested with maggots. A final, cryptic clue comes when Dean tries to pull water from the well and discovers a note from Krysty affixed to the top of the rope. The note urges Ryan not to drink from the well but offers no other explanation, saying that for some unstated reason there's not enough time for one. Reluctantly Ryan and Dean leave the water and head north, towards their friends. Several miles north the pair come across a deep mining pit, now filled with bodies. Dean examines them up close, discovering each has been shot through the head, apparently at point-blank range. Disturbingly, this includes at least a dozen children. Finally as they head into the foothills, Ryan discovers a long note from Krysty, explaining the situation.

Sometime after Ryan's departure, an oxen train of religious settlers passed by the Lauren farm, asking for permission to camp nearby for the night. Jak and his wife Christina cautiously agreed, but along with Ryan's friends made plans to watch their new guests carefully. This proved wise, as that night a number of the settlers attempted to take the ranch by force. Poorly armed and ill-organized, the attackers were quickly fended off and killed. Somewhat alarming signs of sickness on the corpses of the attackers led Mildred to examine other members of the group. She discovered advanced symptoms of the bubonic plague, but an even more disturbing discovery came when Mildred learned the time between the onset of symptoms and the near-terminal stages seen in her examinations was less than two days. Furthermore, the disease appeared to be excessively virulent, among other symptoms causing uncontrollable diarrhea. With the ranch house and immediate area fouled by stricken settlers, including the well, Mildred declared the area needed to be sterilized using the only guaranteed method available: fire. Since the settlers were still a possible combat risk and all just hours away from an agonizing death, it was agreed that they should all be killed. Mildred did so personally, administering a single headshot to each settler. The bodies were then taken by Doc Tanner via oxcart to the mining pit to be interred. The friends then released the Laurens' livestock, intending to round them up later, set fire to the ranch with gasoline, and departed north.

The mystery surrounding the ranch now explained, Ryan and Dean head further into the hills to make camp. During dinner they are surprised by a sec hunter, the fifth of a set of merciless robotic hunters that Ryan mistakenly activated while rescuing his son. The 'droid is programmed to kill Ryan and Ryan alone, at any cost, and has evidently followed him through the MAT-TRANS system. It is heavily damaged, evidently in the course of its pursuit, but is still a potent threat. Attempts to shoot it blind it but do not stop it, and Ryan's one effort at close-quarters combat nearly kills him. Finally Ryan wades into a nearby pond. The sec hunter follows, but stops just shy of the water level reaching its chest. Realizing the damage it has suffered has made some elements of the 'droid no longer waterproof, Ryan pulls the sec hunter fully into the water, escaping with only a heavy blow to the back. The sec hunter shorts out spectacularly, eventually going dark and sinking into the pond. Just a few minutes later, Krysty, Jak, Christina, and Doc Tanner arrive, reuniting with the Cawdors.

The next day Ryan, Krysty, and Jak set off to meet J. B. and Mildred, who have camped in a box canyon to watch over the Lauren's recovered livestock. As they near the edge of the canyon they spot stickies, a particularly vicious breed of mutant so named because of the octopus-like suckers which coat their palms and other parts of their bodies, allowing them to grapple onto surfaces easily, as well as rip the flesh from a human body with trivial ease. The stickies are prone, overlooking the canyon and sighting on something, presumably J. B. and Mildred, through rifles. The three companions quickly dispatch the stickies, only to be held at gunpoint when the rest of the stickies move in behind them. Jak is able to escape, while Ryan and Krysty are tied up and taken to the stickies' camp several miles away.

The leader of the stickies is an unusually intelligent and unusually (for a sticky) blond-haired mutant named Charlie. Almost 20 years prior Ryan, J. B., and a Trader man named Abe cleared out a nest of stickies. The only survivor left was a strangely blond sticky child: Charlie. Resentful over the death of his parents, but equally resentful of their unintelligent, barbaric lifestyle which led to their extermination, Charlie has become well-educated and intelligent, and has organized a large group of fellow stickies into a functioning community, rather than an animalistic nest. He gleefully tells Ryan that his leadership is asserted by periodically and publicly killing "norms", something he says he will enjoy even more when it is Ryan.

Ryan and Krysty are placed in a pit used to hold captives, and discover one of the eight other people there is none other than Abe. This comes as a surprise, since they had assumed Abe was killed while trying to reach the first redoubt. Though shot in the neck with an arrow, Abe was able to remove the shaft and recovered after several months, leaving him with two scars and a ragged voice. The reunion is bittersweet, especially when Charlie tells the captives be intends to have killed all of them within three days. Ryan begins trying to formulate a plan.

The next day the sticky camp is visited by "fladgies", religious worshipers who practice flagellation on themselves and each other. The stickies take them captive, and, in a grim form of irony, decide to whip them to death. In an effort to save himself the leader of the group tells Charlie about a large group of armed lepers he saw heading towards the camp, intent on taking it for their own. Charlie heeds the warning, but allows the fladgies to be whipped to death anyway.

That night, while planning an escape attempt, the captives are interrupted when Ryan is ordered out of the pit. He is tied up and taken by a female sticky who previously made unreturned advances to Ryan while serving him food. Once in her home, the sticky binds Ryan to the bed and then rapes him. After the third time she forces him to perform cunnilingus on her, then attempts to smother him while in this position. Ryan is only saved when the sticky is shot by a leper, one of many now attacking the sticky camp. The leper decides to shoot Ryan as well, only to be shot by an unseen sticky. With both assailants dead Ryan is able to free and arm himself. He makes his way to the holding pit and frees Krysty, Abe, and the other captives; they then recover their confiscated weapons from Charlie's home and make their escape through the mountains. In the process they suffer some losses, and Abe is wounded by a musket shot, making it necessary to carry him. Eventually the group is reunited with J.B., Mildred, Doc Tanner, Dean, and Jak and Christina Lauren, who have come to rescue Ryan and Krysty.

Mildred examines Abe's wound and determines it isn't necessarily fatal, but will need careful observation. When his condition begins to worsen Ryan elects to stay with Abe in a derelict town, in the hopes of allowing him time to regain some health. Jak decides to stay with him, while the rest continue on, hoping to lead Charlie and the band of pursuing stickies away from Abe, Jak, and Ryan. This proves mostly successful, as Charlie investigates the town only briefly before continuing on; however, he leaves behind three scouts who find Ryan and Jak. They are able to kill them all, but not before the third scout stabs Jak in the chest, hitting his lung. Meanwhile, Charlie catches up to the fleeing group, only to be caught in a well-orchestrated trap; he escapes, but all of his companions are killed. Charlie returns to the town, Ryan's friends in pursuit. He draws Ryan out by holding the injured Jak at gunpoint, but before he can kill him he is wounded by a brick thrown by one of the freed captives. A partially recovered Abe then attacks Charlie, wielding a piece of glass as a dagger, and stabs him in the stomach. The sticky is able to overpower Abe and escape.

Two months later the companions are at the Lauren's newly built ranch. Abe has recovered fully, and Jak, while touch and go for a while, is now healed, albeit with minor lung damage. Christina has given birth to Jak's daughter, Jessica; she is also openly resentful towards Ryan for his perceived role in nearly killing her husband. For that reason, Ryan has elected to leave with his friends that day. As he is saying his goodbyes to Jak, Christina calmly calls both of them to the back of the house. There they find Charlie, freshly killed, and Christina holding an axe. Charlie had arrived, begging for food, but made the mistake of threatening Jessica, prompting Christina to kill him with the nearby axe. She then further reiterates her desire for Ryan to leave, to which he agrees.

The companions travel back to the MAT-TRANS chamber under the destroyed redoubt, Abe now with them. When the jump completes Ryan opens his eye and finds something is very wrong....

External links
JamesAxler.com

1992 American novels
Deathlands novels
1992 science fiction novels
American science fiction novels
Works published under a pseudonym
Novels set in New Mexico
Harlequin books